Landrévarzec is a commune in the Finistère department of Brittany in north-western France.

Population
Inhabitants of Landrévarzec are called in French Landrévarzécois.

Breton language
The municipality launched a linguistic plan through Ya d'ar brezhoneg on November 7, 2008.

See also
Communes of the Finistère department

References

External links
Official website 

Mayors of Finistère Association 

Communes of Finistère